José Belvino do Nascimento (29 December 1932 – 8 January 2019) was a Brazilian Roman Catholic bishop.

Early life 
José Belvino do Nascimento was born in Brazil and was ordained to the priesthood in 1956. He served as bishop of the Roman Catholic Diocese of Itumbiara, Brazil,  from 1981 to 1987. He then served as coadjutor bishop of the Roman Catholic Diocese of Patos de Minas, Brazil, from 1987 to 1989. Nascimento then served as bishop of the Roman Catholic Diocese of Divinópolis, Brazil, from 1989 to 2009.

Notes

1932 births
2019 deaths
21st-century Roman Catholic bishops in Brazil
20th-century Roman Catholic bishops in Brazil
Roman Catholic bishops of Divinópolis
Roman Catholic bishops of Itumbiara
Roman Catholic bishops of Patos de Minas